Henry FitzGerald Heard (6 October 1889 – 14 August 1971), commonly called Gerald Heard, was a British-born American historian, science writer, public lecturer, educator, philosopher, and philanthropist. He wrote many articles and over 35 books.

Heard was a guide and mentor to numerous well-known people in the 1950s and 1960s, including author Aldous Huxley, Henry Luce, Clare Boothe Luce, and Bill Wilson, co-founder of Alcoholics Anonymous. His work was a forerunner of, and influence on, the consciousness development movement that has spread in the Western world since the 1960s.

Early life 
The son of an Anglo-Irish clergyman, Heard was born in London. He grew to be an earnest, disciplined, resolute young man. Fascinated with science and technology from childhood, he had turned away from the sort of religiosity and doctrinaire theology of his parents. He studied history and theology at Gonville and Caius College, Cambridge, graduating with honours in history.

After working in other roles, he lectured from 1926 to 1929 for Oxford University's extramural-studies programme. Heard took a strong interest in developments in the sciences and, in 1929, edited The Realist, a short-lived monthly journal of scientific humanism whose sponsors included H.G. Wells, Arnold Bennett, Julian Huxley, and Aldous Huxley. In 1927 Heard began lecturing for the South Place Ethical Society. During the 1930s he became the first science commentator for the BBC.
 
As a young man, he worked for the Agricultural Cooperative Movement in Ireland. In the 1920s and early 1930s, he acted as the personal secretary of Sir Horace Plunkett, founder of the cooperative movement, who spent his last years at Weybridge, Surrey. Naomi Mitchison, who admired Plunkett and was a friend of Heard, wrote of that time: "H.P., as we all called him, was getting past his prime and often ill but struggling to go on with the work to which he was devoted. Gerald [Heard] who was shepherding him about fairly continually, apologized once for leaving a dinner party abruptly when H.P. was suddenly overwhelmed by exhaustion". In the mid-1920s, Heard began a romantic relationship with socialite Christopher Wood, the young heir to a large grocery fortune, with whom he lived in London; by around 1935, however, Heard had declared himself celibate, through he continued to cohabit with Wood.

Horace Plunkett owned real estate in the U.S. states of Nebraska and Wyoming, and left some properties to Heard in his will.

Career

Heard first embarked as a book author in 1924, but The Ascent of Humanity, published in 1929, marked his first foray into public acclaim, as it received the British Academy's Hertz Prize. From 1930 to 1934, he served as a science and current-affairs commentator for the BBC. From 1932 to 1942, Heard was a council member of the Society for Psychical Research.

Heard biographer Alison Falby writes, "Heard’s charisma developed over time, which may have shaped his belief that all humans have the capacity for psychological evolution." In 1929 Heard had his first, fateful encounter with Aldous Huxley, being introduced by the art critic Raymond Mortimer. They conversed at length on the occasion, and remained friends and mutual influences for decades.

In 1931 Heard had initiated an informal research group to look into developing group-mindedness or group communications, which became known as The Engineers Study Group because several of its members were engineers who afterwards were involved in the early development of computers. Naomi Mitchison also participated actively in the group.

After 1936, Heard broke with Mitchison over her outspoken support for the Republicans in the Spanish Civil War and her attempt, together with other members of the group, to run arms to Republican Spain. In his last letter to Mitchison, Heard expressed his sympathy for the victims of the war in Spain but compared the taking of sides in a war to "The relatives of a patient suffering from a deadly disease believing that he is curable by a hedge doctor (...) I am convinced that the way civilization is going is fatal, and the usual remedies only inflame the disease".

Meanwhile, Heard played a minor part in the development of the Peace Pledge Union. Heard became well known as an advocate for pacifism and argued for the transformation of behaviour through meditation and "disciplined nonviolence". In 1937 he emigrated to the United States to give some lectures at Duke University. Heard was accompanied by Aldous Huxley; Huxley's wife, Maria; and their son Matthew Huxley. In the United States, Heard's main activities were writing, lecturing, and the occasional radio or television appearance. He had developed an identity as an informed individual who recognised no intrinsic conflict among history, science, literature, and theology. Though he lectured at Duke, Heard turned down the offer of a post there and traveled west to settle in California.

Heard was the first among a group of literati friends (several others of whom, including Christopher Isherwood, were also British) to discover Swami Prabhavananda, Vedanta, and the Vedanta Society of Southern California. Heard became an initiate of Vedanta. Like that of his friend Aldous Huxley (another in the circle), the essence of Heard's mature outlook was that a human being can effectively pursue intentional evolution of consciousness. He maintained a regular discipline of meditation, along the lines of yoga, for many years. He took interest in parapsychology and was a member of the Society for Psychical Research.

Heard concluded that the impediment to be addressed was "the problem of letting in a free flow of comprehension beyond the everyday threshold of experience while keeping the mind clear."<ref>Heard, Gerald, "Can This Drug Enlarge Man's Mind?" in Psychedelic Review" Issue Number 1, Summer 1963, pp. 8. Millbrook, NY:International Federation for Internal Freedom.</ref> In 1942, he founded Trabuco College as a facility where comparative religion studies and practices could be pursued. It was essentially a cooperative training center for the spiritual life. Living as a freelance scholar, Heard had enjoyed security in America by way of what he had inherited from Horace Plunkett as well as his own family. He used some of his inherited resources toward this most ambitious of projects. The idealistic experiment required land, and Heard bought 300 acres in Trabuco Canyon, in the Santa Ana Mountains.

Heard was the guiding light and a helpful resident sage but, by nature, he was neither an organizer nor a manager. Felix Greene, a nephew of Christopher Isherwood, had filled those roles. Professionally, Greene ultimately pursued a career in journalism and film-making, but at the founding of Trabuco, he had exercised some talent in the planning of architecture and land-development. Soon after the very able Greene left the community and got married, the practical side of life at Trabuco College began to slide. Heard deeded the land and facilities to the Vedanta Society of Southern California, which still maintains the facility as the Ramakrishna Monastery and retreat.

Psychedelics
In 1954 Heard tried mescaline and, in 1955 tried LSD. He felt that, used properly, these had strong potential to "enlarge Man's mind" by allowing a person to see beyond his ego.

In August 1956, Alcoholics Anonymous founder Bill Wilson first took LSD—under Heard's guidance and with the officiating presence of Sidney Cohen, a psychiatrist then with the California Veterans Administration Hospital. According to Wilson, the session allowed him to re-experience a spontaneous spiritual experience he had had years before, which had enabled him to overcome his own alcoholism. In the late 1950s, Heard also worked with psychiatrist Cohen to introduce others to LSD, including John Huston and Steve Allen. With experience, Heard arrived at a judicious view of the value of psychedelics, since at their best the insights and ecstasies they facilitate are temporary states. Religion writer Don Lattin wrote that Heard's view was "LSD might provide an experience of the great mysteries, but it offered no instant answers."

Heard delivered a series of public lectures, as part of the Sequoia Seminars program, on the topics of history, sciences, and cultural issues, also going into his views on the metaphysical connection with higher realities or Divine realms. The program was offered in the Santa Cruz Mountains near Ben Lomond, California, not far from Stanford University. He mentioned the potential value of psychedelic substances (which were not yet banned or highly controlled at that time).

Heard was responsible for introducing the then unknown Huston Smith to Aldous Huxley. Smith became one of the pre-eminent religious studies scholars in the United States. His book The World's Religions is a classic in the field, has sold over two million copies and is considered a particularly useful introduction to comparative religion. The meeting with Huxley led eventually to Smith's connection to Timothy Leary.

Five Ages of Man
In 1963, what some consider to be Heard's magnum opus, a book titled The Five Ages of Man, was published. According to Heard, the prevalent developmental stage among humans in today's well-industrialized societies (especially in the West) should be regarded as the fourth: the "humanic stage" of the "total individual," who is mentally dominated, feeling him- or herself to be autonomous, separate from other persons. Heard writes (p. 226) this stage is characterised by "the basic humanic concept of a mankind that is completely self-seeking because it is completely individualized into separate physiques that can have direct knowledge of only their own private pain and pleasure, inferring but faintly the feelings of others. Such a race of ingenious animals, each able to see and to seek his own advantage, must be kept in combination with each other by appealing to their separate interests."

In modern industrial societies, a person, especially if educated, has the opportunity to begin entering the "first maturity" of the humanic "total individual" in his or her mid teens. However, according to Heard, a fifth stage is in the process of emerging, a post-individual psychological phase of persons and therefore of culture. According to Heard, the second maturity can be one that lies beyond "personal success, economic mastery, and the psychophysical capacity to enjoy life" (p. 240)

Heard termed this phase "Leptoid Man" (from the Greek word lepsis: "to leap") because humans increasingly face the opportunity to "take a leap" into a considerably expanded consciousness, in which the various aspects of the psyche will be integrated, without any aspects being repressed or seeming foreign. A society that recognises this stage of development will honour and support individuals in a "second maturity" who wish to resolve their inner conflicts and dissolve their inner blockages and become the sages of the modern world. Further, instead of simply enjoying biological and psychological health, as Freud and other important psychiatric or psychological philosophers of the "total-individual" phase conceived, Leptoid man will not only have entered a meaningful "second maturity" recognised by his or her society, but can then become a human of developed spirituality, similar to the mystics of the past; and a person of wisdom.

But collectively and culturally we are still in the transitional phase, not really recognising an identity beyond the super-individualistic fourth, "humanic" phase. Heard's views were cautionary about developments in society that were not balanced, about inappropriate aims of our use of technological power. He wrote: "we are aware of our precarious imbalance: of our persistent and ever-increasing production of power and our inadequacy of purpose; of our critical analytic ability and our creative paucity; of our triumphantly efficient technical education and our ineffective, irrelevant education for values, for meaning, for the training of the will, the lifting of the heart, and the illumination of the mind."

Death
Toward the end of his life, Heard was given a bit of financial assistance by Henry Luce and Clare Booth Luce. Heard died on 14 August 1971 at his home in Santa Monica, California, of the effects of several earlier strokes he had, beginning in 1966. At his request there were no memorial services, and his body was donated to the Willed Body Program at UCLA Medical Center.

Fiction
Heard wrote fiction under the name H.F. Heard. This included three detective novels about Mr. Mycroft (implied to be Sherlock Holmes after 
his retirement). Mr. Mycroft and his friend, Mr. Silchester, appeared in three novels: A Taste for Honey, 1941 (televised in 1955 as Sting of Death and filmed, as The Deadly Bees, 1967);Reply Paid; and The Notched Hairpin. The Great Fog and Other Weird Tales and The Lost Cavern and Other Tales of the Fantastic are collections of stories that include both science fiction
and ghost stories. Hugh Lamb has described The Great Fog and The Lost Cavern as "two splendid books of short stories".The Black Fox is an occult thriller featuring black magic.  Doppelgangers is a dystopian novel, influenced by Huxley's Brave New World, set after the "Psychological Revolution." Anthony Boucher described Doppelgangers as "in style and imagination, the most exciting and provocative piece of science fiction since the heyday of M. P. Shiel."

 Bibliography 
Non-fiction
 1924 Narcissus: An Anatomy of Clothes 1929 The Ascent of Humanity 1931 The Emergence of Man 1931 Social Substance of Religion: An Essay of the Evolution of Religion 1932 This Surprising World: A Journalist Looks at Science 1934 These Hurrying Years: An Historical Outline 1900–1933 1935 Science in the Making 1935 The Source of Civilization 1936 The Significance of the New Pacifism (Published in The New Pacifism)
 1936 Exploring the Stratosphere 1937 The Third Morality 1937 Science Front, 1936 1939 Pain, Sex and Time: A New Outlook on Evolution and the Future of Man 1940 The Creed of Christ: An Interpretation of the Lord's Prayer 1941-1942 Training for the Life of the Spirit 1941 The Code of Christ: An Interpretation of the Beatitudes 1941 Man The Master 1942 A Dialogue in the Desert 1944 The Recollection 1944 A Preface to Prayer 1945 The Gospel According to Gamaliel 1946 The Eternal Gospel 1948 Is God Evident?: An Essay Toward a Natural Theology 1949 Prayers and Meditations: A Monthly Cycle Arranged for Daily Use (edited by Gerald Heard)
 1950 Is God in History?: An Inquiry into Human and Prehuman History in Terms of the Doctrine of Creation, Fall, and Redemption 1950 Morals Since 1900 1950 Is Another World Watching?: The Riddle of the Flying Saucers 1952 Gabriel and the Creatures (UK edition entitled Wishing Well)
 1955 The Human Venture 1959 Training For a Life of Growth 1964 The Five Ages of Man: The Psychology of Human HistoryArticles Published in Vedanta in the West
 1939 Is There Progress 1939 Unknown Indian Influences 1939 Is Mysticism Escapism? 1940 The Churches, Humanism and Spirituality 1940 The Return to Ritual 1940 Dryness and Dark Night 1940 Mysticism in "Theologia Germanica" 1940 My Discoveries in Vedanta 1940 The Future of Mankind's Religion 1940 Some Further Notes on Brother Lawrence's Practice of the Presence of God 1941 Notes of Brother Lawrence's Practice of the Presence of God 1943 Vindicae Flammae 1943 The Cloud of Unknowing 1943 The Mirror of Simple Souls 1943 The Philosophia Perennis 1944 Thomas Kelly 1948 Three Key Answers to Three Key Questions 1948 How Shall I Find God When I Have Lost Him? 1948 How Could I Endure the Ruin of My Life Work? 1948 Return to Religion 1949 God is Shy 1949 The Inner Voice 1949 Vedanta and Western History - Part 1 1950 Vedanta and Western History - Part 2 1950 Vedanta and Western History - Part 3 1950 Is Old Age Worthwhile? 1951 What Vedanta Means to Me 1951 Effort or Non-Effort? 1951 Kindness 1952 Fun 1953 Pain 1953 The Supernatural 1956 Vision 1957 Evolution 1958 CommunicationFiction (published under H.F. Heard)
 1941 A Taste for Honey 1942 Murder by Reflection 1942 Reply Paid: A Mystery 1944 The Great Fog and Other Weird Tales 1947 Doppelgangers: An Episode of the Fourth, The Psychological, Revolution 1947 The President of the United States, Detective 1948 The Lost Cavern and Other Tales of the Fantastic 1949 The Notched Hairpin: A Mycroft Mystery 1950 The Black Fox: A Novel of the Seventies See also Explorations Volume 2: Survival, Growth & Re-birth''
Sri Aurobindo
Richard Bucke
Buckminster Fuller
Aldous Huxley
Christopher Isherwood
Lucille Kahn
Walter Russell
Lancelot Law Whyte
Arthur M. Young
Noosphere

References

External links
 
 Gerald Heard Official Biography by Jay Michael Barrie at the Gerald Heard website
 
 Gerald Heard on the Mystical Site www.mysticism.nl
 JSTOR
 Gerald Heard Bibliography 1900–1978 (work in progress ... 50% complete)

1889 births
1971 deaths
20th-century British historians
20th-century British male writers
20th-century British novelists
20th-century British philosophers
20th-century English historians
20th-century English male writers
20th-century English novelists
20th-century English philosophers
20th-century educational theorists
20th-century educators
20th-century essayists
20th-century journalists
20th-century short story writers
Academics from London
Academics of the University of Oxford
Alumni of Gonville and Caius College, Cambridge
British educational theorists
British educators
British emigrants to the United States
British essayists
British ethicists
British horror writers
British male non-fiction writers
British male novelists
British male short story writers
British mystery writers
British pacifists
British people of Irish descent
British science fiction writers
British science writers
British consciousness researchers and theorists
Duke University faculty
English essayists
English horror writers
English male non-fiction writers
Ghost story writers
Historians of science
Human Potential Movement
Journalists from London
Male essayists
20th-century mystics
British parapsychologists
People associated with Conway Hall Ethical Society
Philosophers of education
Philosophers of history
Philosophers of identity
Philosophers of mind
Philosophers of psychology
Philosophers of science
Philosophers of sexuality
Philosophers of social science
Philosophers of war
Psychedelic drug advocates
Psychology writers
Science journalists
Social philosophers
Stage theories
Surrealist writers
Theorists on Western civilization
UFO writers
Ufologists
Weird fiction writers
writers
 
Writers about religion and science
Writers of Gothic fiction
Writers of historical mysteries